Phoenicophanta bicolor is a species of moth in the family Noctuidae (the owlet moths). It was first described by William Barnes and James Halliday McDunnough in 1916 and it is found in North America.

The MONA or Hodges number for Phoenicophanta bicolor is 9028.

References

Further reading

External links
 

Eustrotiinae
Articles created by Qbugbot
Moths described in 1916